Tank Hall, also known as Tank House and Tank Cooperative, is an 1897 Queen Anne living and dining cooperative owned and maintained by Oberlin College in Oberlin, Ohio, United States. Originally the Tank Home for Missionary Children, the house underwent a series of renovations before becoming the co-op it is today.  In 1962, it became the property of Oberlin Student Cooperative Association, the second largest student cooperative in the United States.

History
The house was built by the Oberlin Missionary Home Association in 1897 to house the children of the missionaries abroad. It was designed by Cleveland architect F. A. Coburn. The firm of Glen and Copeland, from Oberlin, were the builders. The Home was named after Mrs. Caroline L. A. Tank, who contributed a quarter of the cost of its construction as a gift from the estate of her late husband Nils Otto Tank, who was a wealthy son of a Norwegian gentryman and worked as a missionary in Dutch Guiana in the 1840s; he also founded a Moravian religious commune in northern Wisconsin. In 1922, after the Association had ended, the College acquired the property for use as a women's dormitory. It became a residential co-operative in 1963.

Architecture
The overall shape of this huge house is rectangular, but many dormers, towers, and bay windows break up the shape. On the front and part of the west side of the house is a recessed porch with spindle railing and square columns. A stairway leads up to the porch on the southwest corner of the building. The walls of the house are brick under the porch, but wood siding on the rest of the house. On the first story, many of the windows have sandstone sills. The house has a flat wooden stringcourse. On the second story is a central window facing the road surrounded by round fluted columns. There is a round tower on the second and third stories on the southwest corner of the house, topped by a bell-shaped roof. The top half-story of the house has many hipped dormers, some of which have small porches with roofs supported by round columns. The roof of the house and all the dormers is flared slightly at the bottom.

This building is set back from the road on a slight hill and has a large front yard. A sandstone path leads from the sidewalk to the front porch and to a large bike-rack on the west side of the house. There is a paved driveway on the east side of the house that leads to a small parking lot in the back. In front of the house is a massive ash tree.

OSCA
Tank, like the rest of the Oberlin cooperatives, is entirely student-run with all participating students working as cooks, buyers, administrators, and coordinators. Most decisions within Tank are made by modified consensus. Similar to Keep and Old Barrows, Tank has a tradition of meat-friendly meals while always having vegetarian and vegan options. Due in large part to its spacious lobby, wrap-around porch, expansive lawn and communal swings, Tank has long been a social anchor of the East Oberlin student community.

In the cooperative spirit, each member of the house has an assigned, equitable task requiring some five hours of cooking or house maintenance every week. The Oberlin Student Cooperative Association (OSCA) remains a nonprofit organization,  and refunds unspent room and board to its members at the end of the school year.

References 

Oberlin College